Pentila carcassoni is a butterfly in the family Lycaenidae. It is found in northern Malawi.

References

Butterflies described in 1961
Poritiinae
Endemic fauna of Malawi
Butterflies of Africa